The World Crafts Council AISBL (WCC-AISBL) is a non-profit, non-governmental organization that was founded in 1964 to promote fellowship, foster economic development through income generating craft related activities, organize exchange programs, workshops, conferences, seminars, and exhibitions—and in general, to offer encouragement, help, and advice to the craftspersons of the world. The organization is now formally registered in Belgium as an international organization and AISBL is there the French shortcut for an international association without lucrative purpose. The WCC is organised into five regions: Africa, Asia Pacific, Europe, Latin America, and North America. The organization is affiliated to UNESCO.

The WCC was founded in 1964 by Kamaladevi Chattopadhay and Aileen Osborn Webb (who had founded the American Craft Council in 1943.) The WCC (Europe) meets once a year and the 2011 meeting was held in Dublin, Ireland. 

The World Crafts Council meets every four years. In 2012, the General Assembly occurred in Chennai when Usha Krishna was the President. After this General Assembly the Presidency will move from India to China. Mr. Wang Shan was the president, Ms. Jing Chen was the Secretary General. In 2014, WCC Golden Jubilee Celebration Summit was held in Dongyang, China, more than 2000 craftspeople from 63 countries participated. In 2016, the General Assembly occurred in Isfahan, Iran from September 22 to 29.

References

External links
 official website

Crafts organizations
Organizations established in 1964
International organisations based in Belgium
International cultural organizations